This is the list of cathedrals in Portugal sorted by denomination.

Roman Catholic

Cathedrals of the Roman Catholic Church in Portugal:
 Angra do Heroismo Cathedral/Church of the Blessed Saviour
 Aveiro Cathedral/Church of Saint Dominic or Church of Our Lady of Mercy()
 Beja Cathedral/Church of Saint James the Great
 Braga Cathedral/Cathedral of Saint Mary 
 Bragança Cathedral/ Church of Our Lady Queen
 Co-Cathedral of Miranda do Douro/Church of Saint Mary the Great 
 Coimbra New Cathedral/Church of the Society of Jesus 
 Évora Cathedral/Cathedral of Our Lady of the Assumption 
 Faro Cathedral/Church of Saint Mary 
 Funchal Cathedral/Church of Our Lady of the Assumption 
 Guarda Cathedral/Cathedral of Our Lady of Consolation 
 Lamego Cathedral/Cathedral of Our Lady of the Assumption 
 Leiria Cathedral/Cathedral of Our Lady of the Immaculate Conception  
 Lisbon Cathedral/Patriarchal Cathedral of Saint Mary the Great 
 Portalegre Cathedral/ Cathedral of Our Lady of the Assumption 
 Castelo Branco Co-Cathedral/Church of Saint Michael 
 Porto Cathedral/Cathedral of the Assumption of Our Lady 
 Santarém Cathedral/College of Our Lady of the Assumption/Seminary of Santarém 
 Setúbal Cathedral/Church of Saint Mary of Grace 
 Cathedral of Viana do Castelo 
 Vila Real Cathedral/Church and Convent of Saint Dominic
 Viseu Cathedral/Cathedral of St. Mary

Former cathedrals
 Sé Cathedral of Bragança/Church of Saint John the Baptist 
Sé Cathedral (Old) of Coimbra/Old Cathedral of Our Lady of the Assumption
 Cathedral of Elvas/Church of Our Lady of the Assumption
 Cathedral of Idanha-a-Velha 
Silves Cathedral/Former Cathedral of Our Lady of the Assumption

Anglican
Cathedrals of the Lusitanian Catholic Apostolic Evangelical Church:
 St Paul's Cathedral in São Paulo, Lisbon

See also
 Lists of cathedrals
 Christianity in Portugal
Roman Catholicism in Portugal
Protestantism in Portugal

References
Notes

External links
 Cathedrals in Portugal
 Conferência Episcopal Portuguesa
 Lusitanian Catholic Apostolic Evangelical Church Official Site

 
Cathedrals
Portugal
Cathedrals